Montezuma Township may refer to the following townships in the United States:

 Montezuma Township, Pike County, Illinois
 Montezuma Township, Gray County, Kansas

See also 
 Montezuma, California, a former hamlet and township in Solano County, California